Housing Justice is a charity based in London formed in 2003 when the Catholic Housing Aid Society (CHAS) (founded in 1956) and the Churches' National Housing Coalition (CNHC) (founded in 1991) merged. It helps churches use spare land for social housing.

As the former names suggest Housing Justice has close links with churches in England and Wales and works with them and church-based projects to raise the profile of homelessness amongst Christians of all denominations.

With over 60 years' experience it is one of the oldest housing and homelessness charity in the UK. Other homelessness charities such as Shelter and Crisis were formed partly as a result of action by CHAS staff and board members.

Details
Robina Rafferty, Housing Justice's first Chief Executive when she was Assistant Director of CHAS served on the Archbishop of Canterbury’s Commission on Urban Priority Areas which was responsible for the 1985 Faith in the City report.

The current Presidents of Housing Justice are the Most Rev Vincent Nichols, Archbishop of Westminster, Rachael Lampard, Team Leader of the Joint Public Issues Team and Bishop Dr Joe Alread.

The Chair of Housing Justice is the Bishop of Rochester, the Rt Revd James Langstaff. The organisation is led by Kathy Mohan, who took over the role in 2017 and is the first non Roman Catholic to lead the charity.

Housing Justice today is active in over 35 communities across the UK funding housing advice centres, community regeneration projects and supporting church based homelessness projects. It is also responsible along with Scottish Churches Housing Action for organising Homelessness Sunday, held in January each year. As well as providing practical help to homeless people, predominantly those classified as 'statutory homeless' - i.e. accepted as homeless under the terms of the homelessness legislation, Housing Justice also campaigns against homelessness, lobbying politicians as appropriate. Housing Justice's predecessor was involved in setting up the All-Party Parliamentary Group on Homelessness and Housing Need in Parliament in 1989.

References

External links

Homelessness Sunday

Homelessness charities in the United Kingdom
Charities based in London
2003 establishments in England